Asclepias pedicellata is a type of milkweed. A perennial herb, it has yellow or green flowers. Its common name is savannah milkweed.

References

pedicellata
Perennial plants